Moran Roth (born November 10, 1982) is an Israeli professional basketball player who last played with Bnei Herzliya of the Israeli Super League. He plays at the point guard position. He won the Israeli Super League championship with Hapoel Holon, in the 2007–08 season. In 2012, he was the Israeli Premier League Assists Leader.

Professional career
After finishing his youth age career at the youth systems of Maccabi Tel Aviv, Roth signed with Hapoel Be'eri of the Israeli third-tier level Liga Artzit. After one year at the third-tier level, Roth played three seasons in the Israeli second-tier level Liga Leumit - one with his hometown team Maccabi Ashdod, and two with Elitzur Ramla.

His performance at the Israeli second league earned him his first Israeli top-tier level Israeli Premier League contract, with A.S. Ramat Hasharon. At the end of his first season with the club, he won the Israeli Super League's Discovery of the Year award, after averaging 7.0 points and 2.7 assists per game.

He signed with Maccabi Rishon LeZion, for the 2005–06 season, and finished with the team in third place in the league.

Roth split the 2006–07 season between Hapoel Galil Elyon and Ironi Ramat Gan.

In the next season, Roth was a key player in the sensational Israeli Super League championship winning team Hapoel Holon, which ended what was at the time a run of 14 consecutive league championships by Maccabi Tel Aviv. In that season, Roth averaged 4.6 assists per game.

After the sensational league championship with Hapoel Holon, Roth signed a contract with the traditional second-best team in Israel, Hapoel Jerusalem.

He split ways with Hapoel Jerusalem after just one season, and signed with Elitzur Ashkelon, for the 2009–10 season.

In June 2010, Roth returned to Hapoel Holon, signing a 2-year contract with them. That season, Roth averaged then career highs of 13.5 points and 5.9 assists per game, which earned him a place in the All-BSL First Team, although his team only finished in 7th place in the Israeli Super League, and was eliminated in the playoff quarterfinals.

The second year of his contract with Hapoel Holon was more successful on the team level, as they finished the season in third place. Roth led the league in assists, with an average of 7.95 per game, and also had two games in which he had 15 assists during the season.

After two good seasons with Hapoel Holon, Roth signed a 3-year contract with the Israeli EuroLeague powerhouse Maccabi Tel Aviv.

Roth parted ways with Maccabi Tel Aviv after only one year due, to a lack of playing time with the team. He then signed with the Israeli Super League's defending champions, Maccabi Haifa, as a replacement for Gal Mekel, who had moved to the NBA.

National team

Roth became a member of the senior Israeli National Basketball Team since 2007. He played at the EuroBasket 2007 and the EuroBasket 2009

Career stats

EuroLeague

|-
| style="text-align:left;"| 2012–13
| style="text-align:left;"| Maccabi Tel Aviv
| 18 || 0 || 6.0 || .333 || .333 || .625 || .6 || 1.2 || .2 || .0 || 1.2 || 1.2
|}

References

External links
Israeli Super League Profile
Eurobasket Profile
EuroLeague Profile

1982 births
Living people
Hapoel Galil Elyon players
Hapoel Holon players
Hapoel Jerusalem B.C. players
Ironi Ashkelon players
Ironi Nes Ziona B.C. players
Ironi Ramat Gan players
Israeli men's basketball players
Israeli Basketball Premier League players
Maccabi Ashdod B.C. players
Sportspeople from Ashdod
Point guards